Tentax badasi is a moth of the family Erebidae first described by Michael Fibiger in 2011. It is found in Brunei.

The wingspan is about 9.5 mm. The head, labial palps, patagia, thorax, tegulae and forewings (including fringes) are beige. The basal costal patch and upper quadrangular-medial area of the forewing are beige, suffused with dark-brown scales. There is an inner black dot in the patch. The abdomen is beige. The crosslines are light brown, including the subterminal area and terminal line. The hindwings are light grey. The underside of the forewings is light brown and the underside of the hindwings is grey with a discal spot.

The only known specimen was collected in secondary vegetation in an Agathis swamp forest.

References

Micronoctuini
Taxa named by Michael Fibiger
Moths described in 2011